Spectrum TV Stream is  an American over-the-top internet television service owned by Charter Communications. The service – which is structured as a virtual multichannel video programming distributor – is only available to Charter Spectrum internet customers. It is designed as an alternative to other competing OTT skinny bundles for cord cutters, offering a selection of major cable channels and on-demand content that can be streamed through smart TVs, digital media players, and mobile apps. The service offers third party services like HBO Max.

Supported devices

Supported Spectrum TV devices include:

TV-connected

 Amazon Fire TV
 Apple TV
 Chromecast
 Roku
 Samsung Smart TV
 Xbox One
 Xbox Series X/S

Mobile
 Android mobile devices
 Apple iOS mobile devices (including iPhones and iPads)

Computer
 macOS
 Windows

See also
 Spectrum
 DirecTV Stream
 FuboTV
 HBO Max
 LocalBTV
 Now
 PlayStation Vue
 Sling TV
 YouTube TV

References

External links
 

Internet television streaming services
Charter Communications